Lisboa is a Portuguese surname. Notable people with the surname include:

Mel Lisboa (born 1982), Brazilian actress
Adriana Lisboa (born 1970), Brazilian writer
Carlos Lisboa (born 1958), Portuguese basketball player and coach
Eduarda Santos Lisboa (born 1998), Brazilian beach volleyball player
Irene Lisboa (1892–1958), Portuguese writer
José Camillo Lisboa (1823–1897), Goan botanist and physician
Lidi Lisboa (born 1984), Brazilian actress
Sofia Lisboa, Portuguese singer

Portuguese-language surnames